The 2011 season is the 27th season of competitive football in Solomon Islands.

National teams 

The home team or the team that is designated as the home team is listed in the left column; the away team is in the right column.

Senior

Friendly matches

2011 Pacific Games

Under-20

2011 OFC U-20 Championship

Under-17

2011 OFC U-17 Championship

S-League

Championship series

Final

OFC Champions League qualifying playoffs

Koloale qualify 3 – 2 on aggregate.

Solomon Islands clubs in international competitions

Koloale FC

References
 Solomon Islands tables at Soccerway
 Solomon Island national team at Soccerway

Seasons in Solomon Islands football
Football
Solomon Islander
Solomon Islander